Maziarze Nowe  is a village in the administrative district of Gmina Iłża, within Radom County, Masovian Voivodeship, in east-central Poland.

References

Maziarze Nowe